Furukawa (written: 古川 or 古河, lit."old river") is a Japanese surname. Notable people with the surname include:

Airi Furukawa (born 1989), illustrator and former member of the Japanese idol girl group SKE48. She is a former member and leader of SKE48's Team KII
Furukawa Ichibei (1832-1903), Japanese industrialist and copper mine magnate
Keiko Furukawa, announcer for Mainichi Broadcasting System
Lisa Furukawa (born 1976), Japanese-American pianist, singer and songwriter (formerly known as Lisa Furukawa Ray)
Makoto Furukawa (born 1989), Japanese voice actor affiliated with Space Craft Group. His most notable role is in the anime One-Punch Man, as the main character, Saitama and Golden Time, as Banri Tada
Miki Furukawa (born 1979), Japanese musician, and former bass guitarist and singer for the Japanese rock band Supercar
Motohisa Furukawa (born 1965), Japanese politician of the Democratic Party of Japan (DPJ), a member of the House of Representatives in the Diet (national legislature)
Narutoshi Furukawa (1900–1996), renowned Japanese photographer
Roppa Furukawa, Japanese comedian
Satoshi Furukawa (born 1964), JAXA astronaut
, Japanese businessman
Takaharu Furukawa (born 1984), Japanese archer
Takashi Furukawa (born 1981), former Japanese football player
Takatoshi Furukawa (born 1987), Japanese professional basketball player who currently plays for Link Tochigi Brex in the National Basketball League (Japan)
Takeshi Furukawa, Japanese-American composer, orchestrater and conductor. His works have spanned the concert stage, films, television, video games and advertising campaigns
Tomo Furukawa, vocalist for Guniw Tools
Toshio Furukawa (born 1946), Japanese voice actor
Tsuyoshi Furukawa (born 1972), former Japanese football player* Furukawa Hompo
Tsuyoshi Furukawa (born 2000), Japanese singer and actor, member of boy group Super★Dragon
Yasushi Furukawa (governor) (born 1958), governor of Saga Prefecture in Japan
Yasushi Furukawa (volleyball) (born 1961), Japanese former volleyball player
Yuki Furukawa (born 1987), Japanese actor
Yūta Furukawa (born 1987), Japanese actor, singer, songwriter and model

Fictional characters
Nagisa Furukawa, main character in the visual novel Clannad

Japanese-language surnames